The Netherlands competed at the 2008 European Track Championships in Pruszków, Poland, from 3 September to 7 September 2008. The Netherlands competed in 14 of the 34 events.

List of medalists 

Source

Results

Elite

Omnium

Source

Under-23

Individual Pursuit

Team pursuit

Scratch

Points race

Junior

Individual Pursuit

Scratch

Points race

See also

Other countries
  Belarus at the 2008 UEC European Track Championships
  Great Britain at the 2008 UEC European Track Championships
  Lithuania at the 2008 UEC European Track Championships
Netherlands at other cycling events in 2008
  Netherlands at the 2008 UCI Track Cycling World Championships
  Netherlands at the 2008 European Road Championships
  Netherlands at the 2008 UCI Road World Championships

References

2008 in Dutch sport
Netherlands at cycling events
Nations at the 2008 UEC European Track Championships